Dean Young may refer to:

Dean Young (poet) (1955 - 2022), American poet
Dean Young (rugby league) (born 1983), Australian professional rugby league footballer
Dean Young (cartoonist) (born 1938), scripter for the Blondie comic strip
Dean Young (snooker player) (born 2002), Scottish professional snooker player